Grand River Township is a township in Wayne County, Iowa, USA.

History
This township is named from the Grand River, which runs through its northeastern section.

References

Townships in Wayne County, Iowa
Townships in Iowa